The Joseph Smith Building, also known as the JSB, is a building that houses classrooms and administrative offices at Brigham Young University in Provo, Utah. The building is named after Joseph Smith, founder of The Church of Jesus Christ of Latter-day Saints. It is the home to BYU's College of Religious Education, containing most of the offices of religion faculty as well as many classrooms where religion classes are held. It also has a large lecture hall that seats about 1,000 people and is used for large classes.

See also
List of Brigham Young University buildings

References

External links

University and college academic buildings in the United States
University and college administration buildings in the United States
Brigham Young University buildings
1991 establishments in Utah